Mogoltavia is a genus of flowering plants belonging to the family Apiaceae.

Its native range is Central Asia.

Species:

Mogoltavia narynensis 
Mogoltavia sewerzowii

References

Apioideae
Apioideae genera